CHEOPS (CHaracterising ExOPlanets Satellite) is a European space telescope. Its objective is to determine the size of known extrasolar planets, which will allow the estimation of their mass, density, composition and their formation. Launched on 18 December 2019, it is the first Small-class mission in ESA's Cosmic Vision science programme.

The small satellite features an optical Ritchey-Chrétien telescope with an aperture of 30 cm, mounted on a standard small satellite platform. It was placed into a Sun-synchronous orbit of about 700 km altitude.

Science overview 
Thousands of exoplanets have been discovered by the end of the 2010s; some have minimum mass measurements from the radial velocity method while others that are seen to transit their parent stars have measures of their physical size. Few exoplanets to date have highly accurate measures for both mass and radius, limiting the ability to study the variety in bulk density that would provide clues as to what materials they are made of and their formation history.

For the planned mission duration of 3.5 years, CHEOPS is to measure the size of known transiting exoplanets orbiting bright and nearby stars, as well as search for predicted transits of exoplanets previously discovered via radial velocity. Scientists behind the project expect these well-characterised transiting exoplanets to be prime targets for future observatories such as James Webb Space Telescope (JWST) or the extremely large telescopes.

History

Prior to launch 

Organized as a partnership between the European Space Agency (ESA) and the Swiss Space Office, CHEOPS was selected in October 2012 from among 26 proposals as the first S-class ("small") space mission in ESA's Cosmic Vision programme. ESA is the mission architect and responsible for the spacecraft and launch opportunity procurement. The project is led by the Center for Space and Habitability at the University of Bern, Switzerland, with contributions from other Swiss and European universities. The Principal Investigator for the science instrument is Willy Benz at the University of Bern and the Principal Scientist from ESA is Kate Isaak. After a competition phase, Airbus Defence and Space in Spain was selected as the spacecraft builder. The ESA mission cost is capped at €50 million. Media Lario S.r.l. (Italy) was responsible for the optical finishing of the primary optical element.

Launch 
CHEOPS launched on board of a Soyuz-AT launch vehicle on 18 December 2019, at 08:54:20 UTC from Centre Spatial Guyanais (CSG) in Kourou, French Guiana. CHEOPS separated after two hours and 23 minutes from lift-off. The primary payload was the first satellite of ASI's COSMO-SkyMed Second Generation constellation, CSG 1. The launcher also deployed three CubeSats, including ESA's OPS-SAT. CHEOPS went into a  altitude Sun-synchronous polar orbit.

First light 
After the cover of the telescope was opened on 29 January 2020, CHEOPS took its first light image on 7 February 2020. The image is centred on the star HD 70843, a yellow-white star located around 150 light years away. The star was selected because of its brightness and position on the sky. The stars in the image are blurry, which is intended. The defocused mirror distributes the light of the star over many pixels of the detector, making the measurements of starlight more precise. The first light images were better than it was expected from tests in the laboratory. The images were smoother and more symmetrical, which could reduce noise caused by the detector and the spacecraft.

In April 2020, the telescope began science operations. See below for the results.

Spacecraft design 
The satellite bus of the CHEOPS spacecraft is based on the SEOSAT platform.

Sunshield 
A sunshield mounted on the platform protects the radiator and detector housing against the Sun, and it also features solar panels for the electrical power subsystem. The sunshield wraps around the hexagonal bus.

Attitude and Orbit Control System (AOCS) 
The control system is 3-axis stabilized, but nadir locked, ensuring that one of the spacecraft axes is always pointing towards the Earth. During each orbit, the spacecraft will slowly rotate around the telescope line-of-sight to keep the focal plane radiator oriented towards cold space, enabling passive cooling of the detector. The typical observation duration will be 48 hours. During a typical 48-hour observation CHEOPS will have a pointing stability of better than eight arcsec at 95% confidence.

CHEOPS Instrument System (CIS) 
The detector, support electronics, telescope, back-end optics, instrument computer, and thermal regulation hardware are known collectively as the CHEOPS Instrument System (CIS). The required photometric precision will be achieved using a single frame-transfer, back-illuminated Charge-coupled device (CCD) detector from Teledyne e2v with 1024 × 1024 pixels and a pixel pitch of 13 µm. The telescope is a single medium-size f/8, on-axis Ritchey-Chrétien telescope with a  aperture, mounted on a stiff optical bench. The University of Geneva and the University of Bern provided the powerful photometer. Target star images are deliberately defocussed to help accurate photometry.

Plaques 
Two titanium plaques with thousands of miniaturised drawings by children have been fixed to CHEOPS. The plaques, prepared by a team at the Bern University of Applied Sciences were unveiled in a dedicated ceremony at RUAG on 27 August 2018. The individual drawings can be found at the website of CHEOPS by clicking on a map of Europe.

Goals
The main goal of CHEOPS is the accurate measurement of the size (radii) of the exoplanets for which ground-based spectroscopic surveys have already provided mass estimates. Knowing both the mass and the size of the exoplanets will allow scientists to determine the planets' density and thus their approximate composition, such as whether they are gaseous or rocky. CHEOPS is the most efficient instrument to search for shallow transits and to determine accurate radii for known exoplanets in the super-Earth to Neptune mass range (1-6 Earth radius).

CHEOPS measures photometric signals with a precision limited by stellar photon noise of 150 ppm/min for a 9th magnitude star. For example, an Earth-size transit across a G star creates an 80 ppm depth.

The different science objectives require 500 separate target pointings. Assuming 1 hour per pointing the mission duration is estimated at 1175 days or 3.2 years. Together with the 20% of open time available for the community the total duration of the CHEOPS mission is estimated to be 3.5 years.

The spacecraft is powered by solar panels that are also part of its sunshield. They provide 60 W continuous power for instrument operations and allow for at least a 1.2 gigabit/day data downlink capacity. Data-taking started in early 2020.

Observation priorities 
Eighty per cent of the science observing time on CHEOPS is dedicated to the CHEOPS Guaranteed Time Observing (GTO) Programme, under the responsibility of the CHEOPS Science Team (chaired by Didier Queloz). The majority of the GTO programme involves the characterization of known transiting exoplanets and improvement of known parameters. Part of the GTO programme is to find transits of known exoplanets that were confirmed by other techniques, such as radial-velocity, but not by the transit-method. Another part of the GTO programme includes exploration of multi-systems and search of additional planets in those systems, for example using the transit-timing-variation (TTV) method.

The other 20% of the science observing time on CHEOPS is made available to the scientific community in the form of an ESA-run Guest Observers' (GO) Programme. Researchers can submit proposals for observations with CHEOPS through an annual Announcements of Opportunity (AO) Program. The approved AO-1 projects include observations of the hot jupiters HD 17156 b, Kelt-22A b, warm jupiter K2-139b, multi systems GJ 9827, K2-138, the exoplanet DS Tuc Ab, 55 Cancri e (likely GTO), WASP-189 b and other exoplanet science related observations, such as planets around rapidly-rotating stars, planet material around white dwarfs and searching for transiting exocomets around 5 Vulpeculae.

Results 
A study of WASP-189b (a 'hot Jupiter') has been published.

TOI-178 has been found to have 6 planets, 5 having orbital resonances. Planetary densities have been calculated.

CHEOPS also sees trails from other satellites during its observations, since it is in low earth orbit.

See also
 List of exoplanet search projects

References

External links

 CHEOPS ESA homepage
 CHEOPS homepage includes orbital tracking of the CHEOPS spacecraft
 Europe to begin search for habitable planets in our cosmic backyard, 22 October 2012, Stuart Clark, The Guardian
 CHEOPS mission visualization - video
 Orbital Tracking at uphere.space

European Space Agency space probes
Science and technology in Switzerland
Space telescopes
Spacecraft launched in 2019
Exoplanet search projects
Cosmic Vision